The Borana calendar is a calendrical system once thought to have been used by the Borana Oromo, a people living in southern Ethiopia and northern Kenya. The calendar has been claimed to be based on an earlier Cushitic calendar, developed around 300 BC found at Namoratunga. However, reconsideration of the Namoratunga site led astronomer and archaeologist Clive Ruggles to conclude that there is no relationship. The Borana calendar consist of 29.5 days and 12 months for a total 354 days in a year. The calendar has no weeks but name for each day of the month. It is a lunar-stellar calendar system.

Structure 
A lunar-stellar calendar, the Borana Calendar relies on astronomical observations of the moon in conjunction with seven particular stars or constellations. Borana months (Stars/Lunar Phases) are Bittottessa (Triangulum), Camsa (Pleiades), Bufa (Aldebaran), Waxabajjii (Bellatrix), Obora Gudda (Central Orion-Saiph), Obora Dikka (Sirius), Birra (full moon), Cikawa (gibbous moon), Sadasaa (quarter moon), Abrasa (large crescent), Ammaji (medium crescent), and Gurrandala (small crescent).

There are 27 names of days of a month. Hence, first two or three days are used twice at the beginning and end of a month.

Months can be identified by moon phase in relation to seven stars or star groups. They star groups are Triangulum (called Lami by Borana), Pleiades (called Busan by Borana), Aldebaran (called Bakkalcha by Borana), Bellatrix (called Algajima by Borana), central Orion (called Arb Gaddu by Borana), Saiph (called Urji Walla by Borana), and Sirius (called Basa by Borana) star systems.

The first day of the new year in Borana calendar starts in the month of "Bittootessa" and the day name "Bitta Kara". This is when Triangulum is in conjunction with the new moon. After that, the calendar simply counts the day names through the month based on that first astronomical observation – conjunction of the new moon at the beta Triangulum position. The next month begins when the new moon is in conjunction with the next star or star system, in this case, Pleiades (a blue star cluster). This occurs 29.5 days after the start of the first month. However, the calendar runs out of day names a couple of days early. This is acceptable since the names of the days that started the month are also the names of the days that finish the month. This is the same for all the months, adjusted for the observations, of course, allowing a variation of a day or two here and there based on the astronomical observation. The third month starts when one spots the new moon rising "in conjunction with" the star Aldebaran. This continues down the list of six Borana star positions for the first six months.

See also 
 Namoratunga

References

Borana Oromo
Ethiopian culture
Specific calendars